The Bahrain Football Association is the governing body of football in Bahrain, and controls the Bahrain national football team. It was founded in 1957, and has been a member of FIFA since 1968. It is a member of the Asian Football Confederation.

Office-holders and officials 

The Association's president is Shaikh Ali bin Khalifa Al Khalifa.  The vice-president is Sheikh Ali Bin Khalifa Al-Khalifa.

The General Secretary is Ebrahim Saad Al Buainain.

The National Men's Team Coach is Hélio Sousa (Portugal) and the Women's Team Coach is Khaled Al-Harban.

Address and website 
Bahrain Football Association

Bahrain National Stadium, P.O. Box 5464, MANAMA, Bahrain

Tel.: +973/17 689 569

Fax: +973/17 781 188

Official website: BFA

Controversies
In November 2017, Saudi Arabia, United Arab Emirates, and Bahrain pulled out of the 23rd Arabian Gulf Cup due to the 2017 Qatar diplomatic crisis.

References

External links 
 
  at FIFA Online
 Bahrain at AFC site

Football in Bahrain
Football
Bahrain
Sports organizations established in 1957
1957 establishments in Bahrain